Mr. White Mr. Black is a 2008 Indian Hindi-language film directed by Deepak Shivdasani, starring Sunil Shetty, Arshad Warsi, Anishka Khosla, Rashmi Nigam, Sharat Saxena, Ashish Vidyarthi and Sadashiv Amrapurkar. The film also features foreign actresses Tania Zaetta and former Miss Thailand Ning.

Plot
Gopi, a simpleton, arrives in Goa from A hamlet(small village) in India Hoshiyarpur, to hand over a tiny piece of land to his dad's friend son Kishen, which was his father's last wish. Kishen, now a conman, swindles people with a little help from his accomplice, Babu, to earn enough money to educate his sister Divya, who's studying in London.

When Kishen gets to know that Gopi has reached Goa to meet him, he avoids him. Only because he thinks that he is a gang member then when he finds out the truth. he doesn't want to give up his flourishing business and travel to Hoshiyarpur just to take possession of a measly piece of land.

However, Gopi is adamant to take Kishen back and is aided by Tanya(whom he meets later in the movie), daughter of the owner of KG Resorts. Little do they realise that three girls are staying at KG Resorts with stolen diamond worth crores. When Kishen, Babu and everyone else learn about this they all make a mad rush for KG Resorts. Gopi finds himself a part of the gang.

Cast
Suniel Shetty as Gopal Murli Manohar / Gopi
Arshad Warsi as Kishen / Hari
Anishka Khosla as Tanya
Sharat Saxena as Inspector Brown
Rashmi Nigam as Anuradha
Sandhya Mridul as Teenie
Tania Zaetta as Meenie
Manoj Joshi as Tulsi (Cab Driver)
Ashish Vidyarthi as Don Ladla
Atul Kale as Babu
Sadashiv Amrapurkar as K. G.
Vrajesh Hirjee as Sardar
Upasana Singh as Sardar's wife
Mahima Mehta as Divya, Kishen's sister.
Shehzad Khan
Kiran Kumar
Shiva Rindani
Deep Dhillon

Soundtrack
Jatin–Lalit are composing the score, two years after their separation. This is the first movie where Mika Singh and his brother Daler Mehndi have sung together.

References

External links
 
 Mr. White Mr. Black Movie Preview

Films scored by Jatin–Lalit
2008 films
2000s Hindi-language films
Films scored by Shamir Tandon
Films directed by Deepak Shivdasani